Bigyra is a paraphyletic grouping of stramenopile organisms.
It includes Bicosoecida, Blastocystis and Labyrinthulida.
It has also been described as containing Opalozoa, Bicoecia, and Sagenista.

Phylogeny
The cladogram below shows the internal relationships within Bigyra:

Classification
The modern taxonomy of Bigyra is as follows:
Phylum Bigyra
Subphylum Opalozoa
Infraphylum Placidozoa
Superclass Wobblata (paraphyletic)
Class Placididea
Class Nanomonadea
Class Opalomonadea
Superclass Opalinata
Class Opalinea
Class Blastocystea
Infraphylum Bikosia
Class Bikosea
Subphylum Sagenista
Class Labyrinthulea
Class Eogyrea

References

External links

 
SAR supergroup unranked clades